Bons's dwarf day gecko or Bons' dwarf day gecko (Lygodactylus bonsi) is a species of lizard in the family Gekkonidae. The species is endemic to Malawi.

Etymology
The specific name, bonsi, is in honor of French herpetologist Jacques Bons (born 1933).

Taxonomy
L. bonsi was originally described as a subspecies of Bernard's dwarf gecko (Lygodactylus bernardi), but has since year 2000 considered a full species.

Geographic range
L. bonsi is found in the Mulanje Massif in southern Malawi.

Habitat

Reproduction
L. bonsi is oviparous.

References

Further reading
Pasteur G (1962). "Notes préliminaires sur les lygodactyles (gekkonidés). II. Diagnose de quelques Lygodactylus d'Afrique". Bulletin de l'Institute fondamental d'Afrique noire 24: 606–614. (Lygodactylus bernardi bonsi, new subspecies). (in French).
Rösler H (2000). "Kommentierte Liste der rezent, subrezent und fossil bekannten Geckotaxa (Reptilia: Gekkonomorpha)". Gekkota 2: 28–153. (Lygodactylus bonsi, new status). (in German).
Travers SL, Jackman TR, Bauer AM (2014). "A molecular phylogeny of Afromontane dwarf geckos (Lygodactylus) reveals a single radiation and increased species diversity in a South African montane center of endemism". Molecular Phylogenetics and Evolution 80: 31–42.

Lygodactylus
Geckos of Africa
Reptiles of Malawi
Endemic fauna of Malawi
Reptiles described in 1962
Taxa named by Georges Pasteur